Cessieu is a commune in the Isère department in south-eastern France.

Geography
The Bourbre flows west through the middle of the commune and crosses the village.

Population

Twin towns
Cessieu is twinned with:

  Civitella Roveto, Italy, since 2004

See also
Communes of the Isère department

References

Communes of Isère